Gilliam is an English surname. Notable people with the surname include:

 Armen Gilliam (1964–2011), American basketball player
 Burton Gilliam (born 1938), American actor
 Colt Gilliam (born 1989), American racing driver
 Cornelius Gilliam (1798–1848), American pioneer, politician, and army commander
 Garry Gilliam (born 1990), American football player
 Herm Gilliam (1946–2005), American basketball player
 Jackson Earle Gilliam (1920–2000), American bishop
 James Frank Gilliam (1915–1990), American historian
 Jim Gilliam (1928–1978), American baseball player
 John Gilliam (born 1945), American football player
 Joe Gilliam (1950–2000), American football player
 Holly Michelle Gilliam (born 1944), birth name of American singer and actress Michelle Phillips
 Reggie Gilliam (born 1997), American football player
 Robert B. Gilliam (1805–1870), American politician and judge
 Sam Gilliam (1933–2022), American artist
 Seth Gilliam (born 1968), American actor
 Stu Gilliam (1933–2013), American actor and comedian
 Terry Gilliam (born 1940), American film director
 Tyrone Delano Gilliam Jr. (1966–1998), American murderer
 William Gilliam (1841–1893), American politician

English-language surnames